For a complete list see :Category:Football clubs in Chad

A
AS CotonTchad
AS DGSSIE
AS Douth
AS Mairie

E
Elect Sport Ouaddai
Elect-Sport FC
Espérance de Walia

F
Foullah Edifice

G
Garde Républicaine
Gazelle FC
Geyser Football Club

P
Postel 2000

R
Renaissance FC

T
Toumaï FC
Tourbillon FC

 
Chad
Chad sport-related lists
Football clubs